Alfred Penney (1851 – November 14, 1922) was a merchant, judge and political figure in Newfoundland. He represented Bay de Verde in the Newfoundland and Labrador House of Assembly from 1878 to 1882 and Carbonear from 1882 to 1889.

He was born in Carbonear, the son of William H. Penney. He established himself in business in Carbonear. Penney served in the Executive Council as surveyor general from 1886 to 1889. An Orangeman, he introduced a motion in the assembly criticizing the acquittal of the Catholic defendants in the Harbour Grace Affray as a miscarriage of justice, which contributed to the fall of William Whiteway's government. Penney was defeated when he ran for reelection in 1889, 1893 and 1897. He was named a district court judge in 1897 and served in that post until his death in St. John's in 1922.

References 
 

Members of the Newfoundland and Labrador House of Assembly
1851 births
1922 deaths
People from Carbonear
Newfoundland Colony judges
Dominion of Newfoundland judges